"Make It Last" is a single by American DJ & producer Dave Audé. The song was released on May 25, 2007 through Audacious Records and features former Pussycat Doll, Jessica Sutta.

Background 
Dave Audé talked about her collaboration with Sutta. He said,
"Jessica was one of the Pussycat Dolls that didn't get a lot of the spotlight in the actual Pussycat band, but she just loves club music. So I've been doing a few songs here and there. I recorded the vocals for her song with Paul Van Dyk's 'White Lies.' She sang on my song which wasn't a full vocal song but it had some, it was more of a club track and fortunately went to number one."

Track listing 
US digital download
"Make It Last (Original Club Mix)"- 9:16
"Make It Last (Ralphi Rosario Remix)" - 9:41
"Make It Last (Emjae Vocal Remix)" -7:21
"Make It Last (Emjae Dub)" - 7:00

Charts 
“Make it Last” reached the #1 spot on Billboard’s Hot Dance Play charts during the week of September 22, 2007.
|-
|}

See also
 List of number-one dance singles of 2007 (U.S.)

References 

2007 singles
2007 songs
Dave Audé songs
Songs written by Sisely Treasure
Songs written by Dave Audé